Mark of the Blade is the sixth studio album by American deathcore band Whitechapel. It was released through Metal Blade Records on June 24, 2016 to mostly positive critical reception. It is the first Whitechapel album to feature lead vocalist Phil Bozeman performing clean vocals on an album, on the songs "Bring Me Home" and "Decennium", and it is the last album to feature drummer Ben Harclerode. A music video for the track "Elitist Ones" was released on June 24, 2016.

Critical reception

Mark of the Blade was met with generally favorable reviews from critics. At Metacritic (a review aggregator site which assigns a normalized rating out of 100 from music critics), based on 6 critics, the album has received a score of 74/100, which indicates "Generally favorable reviews".

At AllMusic, Thom Jurek wrote in a mostly positive that "In making a record that indulges so many of their songwriting obsessions, Whitechapel's The Mark of the Blade [sic] might have been a mess. It's not. Sequence and flow, moods and styles, all form a coherent whole -- albeit one that might have used a tad more judicious editing. But it's hard to fault a band for trying new things, especially when what they deliver is an album with far more hits than misses." He also praised Mark Lewis' production on the album, and compared the closing track to Tool and Slipknot. In a slightly less positive review for Exclaim!, Denise Falzon described the album as "a bit hit-and-miss. Musically, the new touches work well and flow with the rest of the album, but the clean vocals in particular feel forced and sorely out of place."

Track listing

Personnel 
Whitechapel
 Phil Bozeman – vocals
 Ben Savage – lead guitar
 Alex Wade – rhythm guitar
 Zach Householder – third guitar
 Gabe Crisp – bass
 Ben Harclerode – drums

Additional musicians
 Ben Eller – guitar solo on "The Void", "Bring Me Home", "Tormented", "Dwell in the Shadows", "Venomous"

Production
 Mark Lewis – engineering, production, mixing
 Whitechapel – production
 Matt Brown – drum tech
 James Thatcher – drum tech
 Jason Suecof – additional engineering (guitars)
 John Douglass – digital editing

Artwork and design
 Colin Marks – artwork
 Sean Cummings – art direction
 Whitechapel – art direction

Charts

References 

2016 albums
Whitechapel (band) albums
Metal Blade Records albums
Albums produced by Mark Lewis (music producer)